The 2nd Troop of Horse Guards was originally formed in 1659 for Spanish service as Monck's Life Guards. It was successively renamed 3rd, or The Duke of Albemarle's Troop of Horse Guards (1660), 3rd, or The Lord General's Troop of Horse Guards (1661) and, finally, 2nd, or The Queen's Troop of Horse Guards. It fought at the Battle of Dettingen and, in 1746, absorbed the 4th Troop of Horse Guards. In 1788, it absorbed the 2nd Troop Horse Grenadier Guards and was reorganized to become the 2nd Regiment of Life Guards.

Colonels of the 2nd Troop of Horse Guards
Until 1751, British regiments, including the 2nd Troop, were generally known by the name of their colonel, e.g., Howard's Troop of Horse Guards.

1659: Sir Philip Howard
1685: Lt-Gen. George Fitzroy, 1st Duke of Northumberland
1689: Gen. James Butler, 2nd Duke of Ormonde
1712: Lt-Gen. George Fitzroy, 1st Duke of Northumberland
1715: Gen. Algernon Seymour, 7th Duke of Somerset
1740: Gen. Charles Spencer, 3rd Duke of Marlborough
1742: Gen. Charles Cadogan, 2nd Baron Cadogan (absorbed 4th Troop of Horse Guards in 1746)
1776: Gen. Lord Robert Bertie
1782: F.M. Jeffery Amherst, 1st Baron Amherst

References
Archive of regiments.org page

Regiments of the British Army
1659 establishments in England
Military units and formations established in 1659
Household Cavalry